Gert Kleinert is a retired East German slalom canoeist who competed in the 1950s and the 1960s. He won seven medals at the ICF Canoe Slalom World Championships with two golds (C-1: 1965, C-1 team: 1963), four silvers (C-1: 1963; C-1 team: 1957, 1959, 1961) and a bronze (C-1 team: 1965).

References

German male canoeists
Possibly living people
Year of birth missing (living people)
Medalists at the ICF Canoe Slalom World Championships